The Broken Road may refer to:

 The Broken Road (novel), a 1907 novel by the British writer A. E. W. Mason
 The Broken Road (1921 film), a 1921 British film adaptation
 The Broken Road (2007 film), a 2007 film by Eric Filson
 The Broken Road (Leigh Fermor book), a travel book by Patrick Leigh Fermor
 The Broken Road a 1999 album by Jeff White

See also
"Bless the Broken Road", an American country song